Raymond L. Telles Jr. (September 5, 1915 – March 8, 2013) was the first Mexican-American Mayor of a major American city, El Paso, Texas.  He was also the first Hispanic appointed as a U.S. ambassador.

Telles was born and raised in the El Segundo Barrio neighborhood of El Paso, Texas.

Educated as an accountant, Telles worked at the United States Department of Justice for eight years. He was drafted into the Army in 1941. Telles then served in the U.S. Army Air Force where he became Chief of the Lend-Lease Program for Central and South America. Telles left the service with the rank of major.

Telles received the Peruvian Flying Cross, the Order of the Southern Cross from Brazil, the Mexican Legion of Merit and Colombian wings in recognition of the Lend-Lease Program.  Telles served as aide to several Latin American and Mexican presidents  visiting the United States, and as military aide to Presidents Harry S. Truman and Dwight D. Eisenhower when visiting Mexico City.

Telles was elected county clerk for El Paso County, Texas, in 1948.

In 1951, Telles was recalled for the Korean War. He served as Executive Officer of the 67th Tactical Reconnaissance Group, U.S. Air Force.
 
Telles was elected in 1957 mayor of El Paso and ran unopposed for a second term (1959–1961). He was appointed by President John F. Kennedy as Ambassador to Costa Rica.  In 1967 President Lyndon B. Johnson appointed Telles chairman of the U.S.-Mexican Border Commission.

In 1971, President Richard Nixon appointed him chairman of the Equal Employment Opportunity Commission for the United States. Telles died on March 8, 2013, in Sherman Oaks, California, at the age of 97.

Personal life 

Telles's daughter, Cynthia Telles, was a clinical professor of psychiatry at UCLA, before following in her father's footsteps as US ambassador to Costa Rica.

References

 

1915 births
2013 deaths
Mayors of El Paso, Texas
Ambassadors of the United States to Costa Rica
American politicians of Mexican descent
Hispanic and Latino American diplomats
Hispanic and Latino American mayors in Texas
Military aides to the President of the United States
Military personnel from Texas
Equal Employment Opportunity Commission members